Winifred Graham  (born London 21 April 1873; died Hampton-on-Thames 5 February 1950)  was an English novelist and anti-Mormon activist.

Childhood
Matilda Winifred Muriel Graham was born on 21 April 1873 in South Kensington, London. She was baptized in Barnes in June of that year. The daughter of Robert Graham, a wealthy stockbroker, she enjoyed a privileged upbringing in Hampton-on-Thames, displaying literary and dramatic talent from an early age.

Career
Graham's career as an author began in the 1890s.  Her short story "Through the Multitude of Business", published in the summer 1894 issue of Belgravia magazine, described the revenge of a beautiful heiress on a man who had taken advantage of her.  Her first book-length novel, On the Down Grade, was published in 1896.

Graham was a prolific writer, producing eighty-eight books during her lifetime, as well as several short stories published in newspapers and magazines.  In addition to the romantic novels and thrillers which constituted the vast majority of her output, she also wrote a highly critical popular history of Mormonism, two volumes supposedly communicated by her father after his death via automatic writing, and a three-volume autobiography.

Between 1908 and 1924, Graham led a campaign to ban Mormon missionaries from the United Kingdom.  Her novel The Love Story of a Mormon (1911) was adapted into the silent film Trapped by the Mormons (1922).

In addition to her criticisms of Mormonism, Graham also published works critical of Zionism (The Zionists), Christian Science (Christian Murderers), Roman Catholicism (Mary), and the women's suffrage movement (The Enemy of Woman).

Family
In 1906, Graham married Theodore Cory, wealthy son of a Welsh mine-owner.  She continued to use the name "Winifred Graham" professionally, but was known as "Mrs Thedore Cory" in other contexts.  She died in 1950 after an illness of several months, and was survived by her husband Theodore.  They had no children.

Books
 
 
 Reprinted in 1914 by C. Arthur Pearson
 
 
 
 
 
 
 
 
 
 
 
 
 Reprinted in 1905 by Fleming H. Revell
 
 
 
 Reprinted under the title Child of the Wilderness in 1910
 
 
 
 
 Reprinted by Mitchell Kennerley, New York, 1910
 
 Reprinted in 1914 by Mitchell and Kennerley, New York
 
 
 
 
 
 
 
 New and revised edition published by Hutchinson & Co., 1934

Short stories, etc.,  first published in periodicals
 
 
  (republished in Beautiful Mamma and Other Stories)
 
  (republished in Beautiful Mamma and Other Stories)
 
  (republished in Beautiful Mamma and Other Stories)
 
  (republished in Beautiful Mamma and Other Stories)
  (republished in Beautiful Mamma and Other Stories)

Stories serialized in periodicals
 Through the Valley (1895) (serialized in Pearson's Story Teller)
 Six First-Class Passengers (1895) (serialized in Pearson's Weekly)
 Closer than a Brother (1896) (serialized in Home Notes)
 Pauper Blue Blood (1896) (serialized in Short Stories)

Notes

1873 births
1950 deaths
20th-century English novelists
20th-century British women writers
Criticism of Mormonism